The Football Association of Serbia and Montenegro (Serbian:  / ) was the governing body of football in Serbia and Montenegro, based in Belgrade. It organized the football league, the national team, the cup tournament as well as the Second Leagues of both republics.

FSSCG replaced the Football Association of Yugoslavia, which was founded in 1919. It was run exactly the same way but the name changed. In 2006, Montenegro opted to declare independence thus breaking the union with Serbia. Both countries formed new football associations accordingly:
 Football Association of Serbia
 Football Association of Montenegro
Serbia inherited the former Yugoslavia and Serbia and Montenegro spot in UEFA and FIFA while Montenegro became the newest member to join the two organizations.

Famous players

Predrag Mijatović
Savo Milošević
Siniša Mihajlović
Perica Ognjenovic
Dragan Stojković
Branko Brnović
Dejan Savićević
Dejan Govedarica
Dejan Stanković
Vladimir Jugović
Slaviša Jokanović
Aleksandar Kocić
Ljubinko Drulović
Albert Nađ
Goran Đorović
Dragoje Leković
Mateja Kežman
Darko Kovačević
Ivica Kralj
Niša Saveljić
Miroslav Đukić
Dragoslav Jevrić
Zoran Mirković
Ognjen Koroman
Milan Dudić
Ilija Spasojević
Nikola Žigić
Danijel Ljuboja

Achievements

1998 - Round of 16
2000 - Quarterfinals

References

See also
Football Association of Yugoslavia
Football Association of Serbia
Football Association of Montenegro

Serbia and Montenegro
Football in Serbia and Montenegro
Football
Sports organizations established in 2003
2003 establishments in Serbia and Montenegro
2006 disestablishments in Serbia and Montenegro
Sports organizations disestablished in 2006